Proposition 17 refers to two different and unrelated California ballot propositions. 
 1972 California Proposition 17 related to Capital punishment
 2020 California Proposition 17 relates to expansion of voting rights to individuals on parole

California ballot propositions